Irving Lerner (March 7, 1909, New York City – December 25, 1976, Los Angeles) was an American filmmaker.

Biography

Before becoming a filmmaker, Lerner was a research editor for Columbia University's Encyclopedia of Social Sciences, getting his start in film by making documentaries for the anthropology department. In the early 1930s, he was a member of the Workers Film and Photo League, and later, Frontier Films. He made films for the Rockefeller Foundation and other academic institutions, becoming a film editor and second-unit director involved with the emerging American documentary movement of the late 1930s. Lerner produced two documentaries for the Office of War Information during WW II and after the war became the head of New York University's Educational Film Institute. In 1948, Lerner and Joseph Strick shared directorial chores on a short documentary, Muscle Beach. Lerner then turned to low-budget, quickly filmed features. When not hastily making his own thrillers, Lerner worked as a technical advisor, a second-unit director, a co-editor and an editor.

Lerner was cinematographer, director, or assistant director on both fiction and documentary films such as One Third of a Nation (1939), Valley Town (1940), The Land (1942) directed by Robert Flaherty, and Suicide Attack (1950). Lerner was also producer of the OWI documentary Hymn of the Nations (1944), directed by Alexander Hammid, and featuring Arturo Toscanini. He was co-director with Joseph Strick of the short documentary Muscle Beach (1948).

Irving Lerner was also a director and film editor with directing credits such as Studs Lonigan (1960) and editing credits such as Stanley Kubrick's Spartacus (1960). Lerner died during the editing of Martin Scorsese's New York, New York (1977), and the film was dedicated to him.

Legacy
Three of Lerner's films—A Place to Live, Muscle Beach, and Hymn of the Nations—were preserved by the Academy Film Archive in 2007, 2009 and 2010, respectively.

Alleged Soviet espionage
Irving Lerner was an American citizen and an employee of the United States Office of War Information during World War II, and he worked in the Motion Picture Division. Lerner allegedly was involved in espionage on behalf of Soviet Military Intelligence (GRU); Arthur Adams, a trained engineer and experienced spy who escaped to the Soviet Union in 1946, was Lerner's key contact.

In the winter of 1944, a counterintelligence officer caught Lerner attempting to photograph the cyclotron at the University of California, Berkeley Radiation Laboratory; Lerner was acting without authorization. The model for the cyclotron was used for the Y-12 plant at Oak Ridge, Tennessee, for uranium enrichment; and, research work at Stanford using the cyclotron led to the Manhattan Project at Hanford, Washington, dedicated to producing plutonium for the bomb dropped in Nagasaki. Lerner resigned and went to work with Joseph Strick for Keynote Records, owned by Eric Bernay, another Soviet intelligence contact. Arthur Adams, who ran Irving as an agent, also worked at Keynote.

Filmography
As Director

A Town Called Hell (1971, uncredited)
The Royal Hunt of the Sun (1969)
Ben Casey (ABC-TV series, 13 episodes, 1961–1965)
Seaway (1965) (TV series, unknown episodes)
Mr. Novak (NBC-TV series, 1 episode, 1963)
Cry of Battle (1963)
Target: The Corruptors (ABC-TV, 1 episode, 1961)
King of Diamonds (1 episode, 1961)
Studs Lonigan (1960)
City of Fear (1959)
Murder by Contract (1958)
Edge of Fury (1958)
Man Crazy (1953)
Suicide Attack (1951)
Muscle Beach (1948)
To Hear Your Banjo Play (1947)
Swedes in America (1943, with Ingrid Bergman)
The Autobiography of a 'Jeep' (1943, with Joseph Krumgold)
A Place to Live (1941)

As Producer

Hay que matar a B. (1975, co-producer)
The Darwin Adventure (1972, co-producer)
Bad Man's River (1971, executive producer)
Captain Apache (1971, associate producer)
Custer of the West (1967, executive producer)
The Wild Party (1956, supervising producer)
C-Man (1949, producer)
To Hear Your Banjo Play (1947, co-producer)
Hymn of the Nations (1944, producer, uncredited)

As Editor
Mustang: The House That Joe Built (1978)
The River Niger (1976)
Steppenwolf (1974)
Spartacus (1960, uncredited)
The Marines Come Thru (1938)
China Strikes Back (1937, unconfirmed)

As Second Unit Director or Assistant Director
A Town Called Hell (1971, second unit director)
Custer of the West (1967, second unit director: Civil War sequence)
Spartacus (second unit director, uncredited)
Valley Town (1940, second unit director)
One Third of a Nation (1939, second unit director, uncredited)

As Actor
Hay que matar a B. (1975)
On Camera (1 episode, 1955)
Pie in the Sky (1935)

As Miscellaneous Crew
The Savage Eye (1960, technical advisor)
God's Little Acre (1958, associate to director)
Robot Monster (1953, production associate)
 
Editing Department
New York, New York (1977, supervising editor)
Executive Action (1973, associate editor)

Production Manager
Men in War (1957, production supervisor)

As Cinematographer
The Land (1942)

Dedicatee
New York, New York (1977)

See also
Atomic spies
US Office of War Information (OWI)

References
Notes

Bibliography
Frontier Films: Members 
FBI memo, "Soviet Activities in the United States," 25 July 1946, Papers of Clark Clifford, Harry S. Truman Library
 John Earl Haynes and Harvey Klehr, Venona: Decoding Soviet Espionage in America, Yale University Press, 1999), pg. 325

Further reading
Westphal, Kyle (March 25, 2013) "Irving Lerner: A Career in Context" Chicago Film Society
Gustafson, Frederick July 7, 2017 On Film: Irving Lerner

External links

1909 births
1976 deaths
American film directors
American cinematographers